Wolcottville is a town in Johnson Township, LaGrange County and Orange Township, Noble County in the U.S. state of Indiana. The population was 998 at the 2010 census.

History
Wolcottville was laid out in 1849. It was named for George Wolcott, who started a sawmill at the site in 1838.

Geography
Wolcottville is located at  (41.525522, -85.366015).

In addition to these year-round residents, many homes in the area are lake cottages occupied only in the summers. Many of the owners of these cottages come from Fort Wayne and South Bend.

Demographics

2010 census
As of the census of 2010, there were 998 people, 369 households, and 264 families living in the town. The racial makeup of the town was 96.0% White, 0.5% African American, 0.7% Native American, 0.8% Asian, 1.5% from other races, and 0.5% from two or more races. Hispanic or Latino of any race were 1.8% of the population.

There were 369 households, of which 40.9% had children under the age of 18 living with them, 52.6% were married couples living together, 13.6% had a female householder with no husband present, 5.4% had a male householder with no wife present, and 28.5% were non-families. 24.1% of all households were made up of individuals, and 9% had someone living alone who was 65 years of age or older. The average household size was 2.70 and the average family size was 3.21.

The median age in the town was 33.8 years. 29.3% of residents were under the age of 18; 9% were between the ages of 18 and 24; 27.1% were from 25 to 44; 24.1% were from 45 to 64; and 10.3% were 65 years of age or older. The gender makeup of the town was 48.3% male and 51.7% female.

2000 census
As of the census of 2000, there were 933 people, 350 households, and 249 families living in the town. The racial makeup of the town was 98.82% White, 0.11% African American, 0.21% Native American, 0.11% Asian, 0.21% from other races, and 0.54% from two or more races. Hispanic or Latino of any race were 0.75% of the population.

There were 350 households, out of which 41.1% had children under the age of 18 living with them, 52.0% were married couples living together, 13.1% had a female householder with no husband present, and 28.6% were non-families. 23.7% of all households were made up of individuals, and 8.3% had someone living alone who was 65 years of age or older. The average household size was 2.67 and the average family size was 3.15.

In the town, the population was spread out, with 31.0% under the age of 18, 10.2% from 18 to 24, 31.1% from 25 to 44, 18.2% from 45 to 64, and 9.5% who were 65 years of age or older. The median age was 31 years. For every 100 females, there were 93.2 males. For every 100 females age 18 and over, there were 92.2 males.

The median income for a household in the town was $35,833, and the median income for a family was $36,458. Males had a median income of $30,705 versus $21,902 for females. The per capita income for the town was $16,974. About 9.1% of families and 10.9% of the population were below the poverty line, including 14.9% of those under age 18 and 9.9% of those age 65 or over.

Education
The town of Wolcottville lies in the school district of Lakeland School Corporation. The local schools town residents attend are:
Wolcottmills Preschool
Lakeland Intermediate School
Lakeland Jr/Sr High School

Notable people
 Ken Kercheval, actor
 William L. Taylor, Indiana Attorney General (1898-1903)

References

External links
 Lakeland School Corporation

Towns in LaGrange County, Indiana
Towns in Noble County, Indiana
Towns in Indiana